Maru is a given name. In Spanish it is a short form (hypocorism) of María Eugenia.

Notable people with the name include:
 Maru Daba (born 1980), Ethiopian runner
 Maru Díaz (born 1990), Spanish politician
 Maru Dueñas (1967–2017), Mexican actress
 Maru Nihoniho (born 1972), New Zealand entrepreneur
 Maru Sira (1948–1975), Sri Lankan criminal

Animals
 Maru (cat) (born 2007), Japanese YouTube personality

Spanish feminine given names